Pedro Aranaz y Vides (1742–1821) was a Spanish composer. Some of his works are preserved in the El Escorial archive.

Works, editions, recordings
 tonadilla: La maja limonera.

References

Spanish composers
Spanish male composers
1742 births
1821 deaths